Sachal Wind Power Project is a wind farm with a total capacity of 49.5MW which corresponds to an annual production of approximately 136.5 GW.

References

External links 
Sachal Wind Power Project map at Engineering Historical Memory

Wind farms in Pakistan
2017 establishments in Pakistan